Sture Henrik Stork (25 July 1930 – 27 March 2002) was a Swedish sailor who competed in the 1956 and 1964 Summer Olympics.

In 1956 he won the gold medal as part of the Swedish boat Rush V in the 5.5 metre class event. Eight years later he won the silver medal as crew member of the Swedish boat Rush VII in the 5.5 metre class event.

References

External links
 
 
 
 
 

1930 births
2002 deaths
Swedish male sailors (sport)
Sailors at the 1956 Summer Olympics – 5.5 Metre
Sailors at the 1964 Summer Olympics – 5.5 Metre
Olympic sailors of Sweden
Olympic gold medalists for Sweden
Olympic silver medalists for Sweden
Olympic medalists in sailing
Royal Swedish Yacht Club sailors

Medalists at the 1964 Summer Olympics
Medalists at the 1956 Summer Olympics